Gwak Been (born May 28, 1999) is South Korean professional baseball pitcher for the Doosan Bears of the KBO League. He graduated from Baemyung High School and was selected for the Doosan Bears as the first pick at draft in 2018.

References

External links 
 Career statistics and player information from the KBO League
 Kwak Bin at Doosan Bears Baseball Club

Living people
1999 births
Baseball players from Seoul
South Korean baseball players
Doosan Bears players
KBO League pitchers
2023 World Baseball Classic players